Banneker Circle is a partial traffic circle in Southwest Washington, D.C.  The name of the circle commemorates Benjamin Banneker, an African American astronomer and almanac author. In 1791, Banneker assisted in the initial survey of the boundaries of the District of Columbia. The circle is near the south end of L'Enfant Promenade and the intersection of Interstate 395 and Maine Avenue. Benjamin Banneker Park is located in the center of the circle.

See also
List of circles in Washington, D.C.

References

External links

Squares, plazas, and circles in Washington, D.C.
Streets in Washington, D.C.
Southwest Waterfront
Benjamin Banneker